Greek theatre or Greek theater may refer to:

Theatre of Ancient Greece
Any of a number of surviving Ancient Greek theatre structures

Modern recreations
Italy
Greek Theatre of Syracuse, Sicily, Italy

United States
Hearst Greek Theatre, at the University of California (Berkeley)
Greek Theatre (Los Angeles), California
Greek Theater and Colonnade of Civic Benefactors, Denver, Colorado, in Denver Civic Center 
Greek Theatre (Baton Rouge), Louisiana at Louisiana State University